The Coastal Plain League was a Minor league baseball affiliated circuit which, except for the war years (1942–1945), operated in North Carolina between 1937 and 1952. It was classified as a "D" league. It grew out of a semi-pro league that operated from 1935 to 1936 under the same Coastal Plain League name. Today, the summer collegiate baseball league has adopted the Coastal Plain League moniker.

Cities represented
 
Ayden, NC: Ayden Aces (1937–1938)
Edenton, NC: Edenton Colonials (1952)
Fayetteville, NC: Fayetteville Cubs (1946)
Goldsboro, NC: Goldsboro Goldbugs (1937–1941,1946–1949); Goldsboro Cardinals (1950–1951); Goldsboro Jets (1952)
Greenville, NC: Greenville Greenies (1937–1941,1946–49); Greenville Robins (1950–1951)
Kinston, NC: Kinston Eagles (1937–1941, 1946–1952)
New Bern, NC: New Bern Bears (1937–1941, 1946–1952)
Roanoke Rapids, NC: Roanoke Rapids Blue Jays (1947); Roanoke Rapids Jays (1948–1952)
Rocky Mount, NC: Rocky Mount Leafs (1941); Rocky Mount Rocks (1946); Rocky Mount Leafs (1947–1952)
Snow Hill, NC: Snow Hill Billies (1937–1940)
Tarboro, NC: Tarboro Combs (1937); Tarboro Serpents (1938–1939); Tarboro Tars (1940); Tarboro Orioles (1941); Tarboro Tars (1946–1948); Tarboro Athletics (1949);  Tarboro Tars (1950); Tarboro A's (1951); Tarboro Tars (1952)
Williamston, NC: Williamston Martins (1937–1941)
Wilson, NC: Wilson Tobs (1939–1941, 1946–1952)

 Tarboro was also known as the Goobers in 1939

Standings & statistics

1937 to 1941 
1937 Coastal Plain Leagueschedule
Playoff: Snow Hill 3 games, New Bern 1; Tarboro 3 games, Williamston 1.Finals: Snow Hill 4 games, Tarboro 1. 

 
1938 Coastal Plain League
Playoff: New Bern 4 games, Kinston 0; Snow Hill 4 games, Tarboro 2.Finals: New Bern 4 games, Snow Hill 0. 

1939 Coastal Plain League
Playoff: Kinston 4 games, Greenville 2; Williamston 4 games, Goldsboro 1.Finals: Williamston 4 games, Kinston 1. 
 
1940 Coastal Plain Leagueschedule
Playoff: Kinston 4 games, Wilson 3; Tarboro 4 games, Goldsboro 1.Finals: Tarboro 4 games, Kinston 2. 
 
1941 Coastal Plain League
Playoff: Wilson 4 games, Rocky Mount 1; Greenville 4 games, New Bern 2.Finals: Wilson 4 games, Greenville 2. 
 
The league did not play From 1942 thru 1945 due to World War II

1946 to 1952 
1946 Coastal Plain League  schedule
Playoff: Rocky Mount 4 games, Goldsboro 1; Kinston 4 games, Wilson 3.Finals: Rocky Mount 4 games, Kinston 2. 
 
1947 Coastal Plain League schedule
Playoff: Wilson 4 games, New Bern 1; Kinston 4 games, Tarboro 2.Finals: Kinston 4 games, Wilson 2. 

1948 Coastal Plain League schedule
Playoff: Tarboro 4 games, Rocky Mount 2; Kinston 4 games, Goldsboro 3.Finals: Tarboro 4 games, Kinston 1. 
 
1949 Coastal Plain Leagueschedule
Playoff: Greenville 4 games, Rocky Mount 2; Kinston 4 games, New Bern 2.Finals: Greensville 4 games, Kinston 2. 
 
1950 Coastal Plain League schedule
Playoff: Kinston 4 games, Roanoke Rapids 0; New Bern 4 games, Rocky Mount 2.Finals: New Bern 4 games, Kinston 0. 

1951 Coastal Plain Leagueschedule
Tarboro and Greensville disbanded June 6.Playoff: Wilson 4 games, Kinston 2; New Bern 4 games, Goldsboro 2.Finals: New Bern 4 games, Wilson 3. 
 
1952 Coastal Plain Leagueschedule
Playoff: Goldsboro 4 games, Kinston 3; Edenton 4 games, Wilson 0.Finals: Edenton 4 games, Goldsboro 1.

Coastal Plain League Champions
 
1937 – Snow Hill
1938 – New Bern
1939 – Williamston
1940 – Tarboro
1941 – Wilson
1946 – Rocky Mount
1947 – Kinston
1948 – Tarboro
1949 – Greenville
1950 – New Bern
1951 – New Bern
1952 – Edenton

References

External links
Baseball Reference – Coastal Plain League History

Defunct minor baseball leagues in the United States
Baseball leagues in North Carolina
Sports leagues established in 1937
Sports leagues disestablished in 1952